The 2019 NCAA Division I FCS football season, part of college football in the United States, was organized by the National Collegiate Athletic Association (NCAA) at the Division I Football Championship Subdivision (FCS) level.  The FCS Championship Game was played on January 11, 2020, in Frisco, Texas. North Dakota State entered the season as the defending champion, and after completing the regular season undefeated, successfully defended their title and secured their eighth championship in nine seasons.

Conference changes and new programs

Membership changes

The 2019 season was the last for Presbyterian in Big South Conference football. The school announced in 2017 that it had begun a transition to non-scholarship football. Presbyterian will play the 2020 season as an FCS independent before joining the non-scholarship FCS Pioneer Football League in 2021; it will remain a full but non-football Big South member.

This was also the final season for Jacksonville football, as the school announced shortly after the end of the season that it was dropping the sport.

Rule changes
The following playing rule changes have been recommended by the NCAA Football Rules Committee for 2019:

 Requiring replay reviews on targeting calls be either confirmed or overturned by reviewing all aspects of the play.  If the review shows not all elements of targeting exist or if there is no indisputable video evidence, the call will be overturned.
 Players who commit a second targeting penalty in the same season will not only have to sit out the remainder of that game, but will also have to sit out their team's entire next scheduled game.
 Eliminating the two-man wedge on kickoffs.
 Starting with the fifth overtime period, each team will line up to attempt a two-point conversion instead of snapping the ball from the 25-yard-line. Successful plays are scored as conversions.
Adding a two-minute break after the second and fourth overtime period.
Blindside blocks delivered with forcible contact will draw a 15-yard penalty (personal foul). If elements of targeting exist, the player delivering the block will be subject to ejection as with any other targeting foul.

All FCS teams were allowed to schedule 12 regular season games in the 2019 season. A standard provision of NCAA bylaws allows for 12 regular season games during years having 14 Saturdays in the period starting with the Labor Day (first Monday in September) weekend and ending with the last Saturday of November. The next time that a 12-game regular season will be allowed is 2024.

"Week Zero"
The regular season began with two games on Saturday, August 24:
Villanova def. No. 13 Colgate, 34–14
FCS Kickoff (Cramton Bowl, Montgomery, Alabama): Youngstown State def. Samford, 45–22

FCS team wins over FBS teams
(FCS rankings from the STATS poll, FBS rankings from the AP poll.)
August 29:
Central Arkansas 35, Western Kentucky 28
September 7:
Southern Illinois 45, UMass 20
September 14:
The Citadel 27, Georgia Tech 24 OT

Non-DI team wins over FCS teams
September 7:
Kentucky State 13, Robert Morris 7
East Stroudsburg 24, Wagner 14
Virginia Union 36, Hampton 17
Truman 10, Drake 7
Midwestern State 33, Northwestern State 7
Tarleton State 37, Stephen F. Austin 26
September 14:
Taylor (IN) 17, Butler 14
September 21:
Truman 38, Valparaiso 7 
September 28:
Charleston (WV) 19, Valparaiso 13
Kentucky State 33, Jackson State 25
October 12:
Missouri S&T 23, Texas Southern 20

Conference standings

Postseason
A 24-team single-elimination tournament bracket culminated in the 2020 NCAA Division I Football Championship Game. Champions of the following 10 conferences automatically received playoff bids:

 Big Sky (Weber State)
 Big South (Monmouth)
 Colonial Athletic Association (James Madison)
 Missouri Valley Football Conference (North Dakota State)
 Northeast Conference (Central Connecticut)

 Ohio Valley Conference (Austin Peay)
 Patriot League (Holy Cross)
 Pioneer Football League (San Diego)
 Southern Conference (Wofford)
 Southland Conference (Nicholls)

Teams were announced in a selection show on November 24, with the top eight teams seeded and receiving first-round byes.

NCAA Division I playoff bracket

Source:

Bowl games

Coaching changes

Preseason and in-season
This is restricted to coaching changes that took place on or after May 1, 2019. For coaching changes that occurred earlier in 2019, see 2018 NCAA Division I FCS end-of-season coaching changes.

 Prince was placed on administrative leave by the university, "after allegations of verbal abuse and intimidation of players."

End of season

See also
2019 NCAA Division I FCS football rankings
2019 NCAA Division I FBS football season
2019 NCAA Division II football season
2019 NCAA Division III football season
2019 NAIA football season

Notes

References